National Highway 8 (NH 8) is a  National Highway in India running from Karimganj in Assam to Sabroom in Tripura.

It is not to be confused with former NH 8 (Delhi-Jaipur-Baroda-Bombay), which has been renumbered NH 48.

References

External links 
NH 8 on OpenStreetMap

National highways in India